The urethra (from Greek οὐρήθρα – ourḗthrā) is a tube that connects the urinary bladder to the urinary meatus for the removal of urine from the body of both females and males. In human females and other primates, the urethra connects to the urinary meatus above the vagina, whereas in marsupials, the female's urethra empties into the urogenital sinus.

Females use their urethra only for urinating, but males use their urethra for both urination and ejaculation. The external urethral sphincter is a striated muscle that allows voluntary control over urination. The internal sphincter, formed by the involuntary smooth muscles lining the bladder neck and urethra, receives its nerve supply by the sympathetic division of the autonomic nervous system. The internal sphincter is present both in males and females.

Structure 
The urethra is a fibrous and muscular tube which connects the urinary bladder to the external urethral meatus. Its length differs between the sexes, because it passes through the penis in males.

Male 

The urethra is divided into four parts in men, named after the location:

There is inadequate data for the typical length of the male urethra; however, a study of 109 men showed an average length of 22.3 cm (SD = 2.4 cm), ranging from 15 cm to 29 cm.

Female 
In the human female, the urethra is about 4 cm long, and exits the body between the clitoris and the vagina, extending from the internal to the external urethral orifice. The meatus is located below the clitoris. It is placed behind the symphysis pubis, embedded in the anterior wall of the vagina, and its direction is obliquely downward and forward; it is slightly curved with the concavity directed forward. The proximal two-thirds of the urethra is lined by transitional epithelial cells, while the distal third is lined by stratified squamous epithelial cells.

Between the superior and inferior fascia of the urogenital diaphragm, the female urethra is surrounded by the urethral sphincter.

Microanatomy 
The cells lining the urethra (the epithelium) start off as transitional cells as it exits the bladder, which are variable layers of flat to cuboidal cells that change shape depending on whether they are compressed by the contents of the urethra. Further along the urethra there are pseudostratified columnar and stratified columnar epithelia. The lining becomes multiple layers of flat cells near the end of the urethra, which is the same as the external skin around it.

There are small mucus-secreting urethral glands, as well as bulbo-urethral glands of Cowper, that secret mucous acting to lubricate the urethra.

The urethra consists of three coats: muscular, erectile, and mucous, the muscular layer being a continuation of that of the bladder.

Blood and nerve supply and lymphatics
Somatic (conscious) innervation of the external urethral sphincter is supplied by the pudendal nerve.

Development

In the developing embryo, at the hind end lies a cloaca. This, over the fourth to the seventh week, divides into a urogenital sinus and the beginnings of the anal canal, with a wall forming between these two inpouchings called the urorectal septum. The urogenital sinus divides into three parts, with the middle part forming the urethra; the upper part is largest and becomes the urinary bladder, and the lower part then changes depending on the biological sex of the embryo. The cells lining the urethra (the epithelium) come from endoderm, whereas the connective tissue and smooth muscle parts are derived from mesoderm.

After the third month, urethra also contributes to the development of associated structures depending on the biological sex of the embryo. In the male, the epithelium multiples to form the prostate. In the female, the upper part of the urethra forms the urethra and paraurethral glands.

Function

Urination

The urethra is the vessel through which urine passes after leaving the bladder. During urination, the smooth muscle lining the urethra relaxes in concert with bladder contraction(s) to forcefully expel the urine in a pressurized stream. Following this, the urethra re-establishes muscle tone by contracting the smooth muscle layer, and the bladder returns to a relaxed, quiescent state. Urethral smooth muscle cells are mechanically coupled to each other to coordinate mechanical force and electrical signaling in an organized, unitary fashion.

Ejaculation
The male urethra is the conduit for semen during sexual intercourse. Urine is removed before ejaculation by pre-ejaculate fluid – called Cowper's fluid – from the bulbourethral gland.

Clinical significance

Infection of the urethra is urethritis, which often causes purulent urethral discharge. It is most often due to a sexually transmitted infection such as gonorrhoea or chlamydia, and less commonly due to other bacteria such as ureaplasma or mycoplasma; trichomonas vaginalis; or the viruses herpes simplex virus and adenovirus. Investigations such as a gram stain of the discharge might reveal the cause; nucleic acid testing based on the first urine sample passed in a day, or a swab of the urethra sent for bacterial culture and sensitivity may also be used. Treatment usually involves antibiotics that treat both gonorrhoea and chlamydia, as these often occur together. A person being treated for urethritis should not have sex until the infection is treated, so that they do not spread the infection to others. Because of this spread, which may occur during an incubation period before a person gets symptoms, there is often contact tracing so that sexual partners of an affected person can be found and treatment offered.

Cancer can also develop in the lining of the urethra. When cancer is present, the most common symptom in an affected person is blood in the urine; a physical medical examination may be otherwise normal, except in late disease. Cancer of the urethra is most often due to cancer of the cells lining the urethra, called transitional cell carcinoma, although it can more rarely occur as a squamous cell carcinoma if the type of cells lining the urethra have changed, such as due to a chronic schistosomiasis infection. Investigations performed usually include collecting a sample of urine for an inspection for malignant cells under a microscope, called cytology, as well as examination with a flexible camera through the urethra, called urethroscopy. If a malignancy is found, a biopsy will be taken, and a CT scan will be performed of other body parts (a CT scan of the chest, abdomen and pelvis) to look for additional  lesions. After the cancer is staged, treatment may involve chemotherapy.

Injury
Passage of kidney stones through the urethra can be painful. Damage to the urethra, such as by kidney stones, chronic infection, cancer, or from catheterisation, can lead to narrowing, called a urethral stricture. The location and structure of the narrowing can be investigated with a medical imaging scan in which dye is injected through the urinary meatus into the urethra, called a retrograde urethrogram. Additional forms of imaging, such as ultrasound, computed tomography and magnetic resonance imaging may also be used to provide further details.

Injuries to the urethra (e.g., from a pelvic fracture)

Foreign bodies in the urethra are uncommon, but there have been medical case reports of self-inflicted injuries, a result of insertion of foreign bodies into the urethra such as an electrical wire.

Other
Hypospadias and epispadias are forms of abnormal development of the urethra in the male, where the meatus is not located at the distal end of the penis (it occurs lower than normal with hypospadias, and higher with epispadias). In a severe chordee, the urethra can develop between the penis and the scrotum.

Catheterisation
A tube called a catheter can be inserted through the urethra to drain urine from the bladder, called an indwelling urinary catheter; or, to bypass the urethra, a catheter may be directly inserted through the abdominal wall into the bladder, called a suprapubic catheter. This may be to relieve or bypass an obstruction, to monitor how much urine someone produces, or because a person has difficulty urinating, for example due to a neurological cause such as multiple sclerosis. Complications that are associated with catheter insertion can include catheter-associated infections, injury to the urethra or nearby structures, or pain.

Other animals

History
The word "urethra" comes from the Ancient Greek stem "uro" relating to urination, with the structure described as early as the time of Hippocrates. Confusingly however, at the time it was called "ureter". Thereafter, terms "ureter" and "urethra" were variably used to refer to each other thereafter for more than a millennia. It was only in the 1550s that anatomists such as Bartolomeo Eustacchio and Jacques Dubois began to use the terms to specifically and consistently refer to what is in modern English called the ureter and the urethra. Following this, in the 19th and 20th centuries multiple terms relating to the structures such as urethritis and urethrography, were coined.

Kidney stones have been identified and recorded about as long as written historical records exist. The urinary tract as well as its function to drain urine from the kidneys, has been described by Galen in the second century AD. Surgery to the urethra to remove kidney stones has been described since at least the first century AD by Aulus Cornelius Celsus.

Additional images

See also
 Perineal urethra
 Vulvovaginal health
 Urethral glands
 Urethral sponge
 Sexual stimulation: Urethral sounding and Urethral intercourse
 Urethrorrhagia
 Urethrotomy
 Internal urethral orifice

References

External links
  "Male Urethra"

 
Mammal reproductive system
Urinary system
Human reproductive system